The St. Joseph the Worker Chapel, commonly known as the Angry Christ Church, is a Roman Catholic chapel located inside the Victorias Milling Company residential complex in Victorias City, Negros Occidental, Philippines.  It is considered as the first example of modern sacred architecture in the Philippines as well as part of its industrial heritage.  It is dedicated to St. Joseph the Worker.

The church was designed by the Czech architect Antonín Raymond, himself already recognized as the founder of modern architecture in Japan. Raymond designed the church to be earthquake-proof since the Philippines is in the earthquake belt. The St. Joseph the Worker Chapel is made up of two sections, the nave and the tower. They are connected by movable beams holding the building up well even during earthquakes. Raymond also took into consideration the climate in the Philippine thus he designed the  structure to allow maximum air circulation in the hot and humid climate.  The church was declared Important Cultural Property of the Philippines in December 2015.

The church is also known for its modern altar painting of so-called "Angry Christ" painted in vivid colors by Alfonso Ossorio, Filipino-American abstract expressionist artist.

History
It was built between 1948-50 by the Ossorio family thus it is sometimes called the Ossorio's Chapel  The Ossorios originally planned to offer the job to the then young Filipino architect Leandro Locsin, but later changed their mind and selected then-already internationally acclaimed Antonín Raymond. Raymond then had designed buildings in the United States, Japan, India, Indonesia and other Asian countries. This event caused Locsin to change his style to more modern architecture, which made him famous later.

Art in the church 
The mural inside the church, commonly called “The Angry Christ”, is by Philippine-born Alfonso Ossorio, friend of Jackson Pollock and Clyfford Still. Mosaics are by the Belgian Adelaide de Bethune. The materials and talents were provided by the local artists Arcadio Anore and Benjamin Valenciano. Arcadio Anore executed Bethune's designs for the brass plates in the pulpit and baptistery while Benjamin Valenciano did the wooden image sculptures inside the church including the images for the Stations of the Cross. Their works were recognized by the Philippine religious arts for introducing a "Filipinized" version of religious themes depicting Mary, Joseph and the characters in the Fourteen Stations of the Cross to have brown skin in traditional Filipino attire.

References

External links

 Photos on the interior on Beautiful Churches in the Philippines
 Angry Christ Church: An Icon of Modern Liturgical Art & Architecture in the Philippines
 Chapel of St. Joseph the Worker
 Angry Christ Church Victorias City

Tourist attractions in Negros Occidental
Roman Catholic churches in Negros Occidental